Gorno Divjaci is a village in the municipality of Kruševo, North Macedonia.

Demographics
According to the 2021 census, the village had a total of 11 inhabitants. Ethnic groups in the village include:

Macedonians 11

References

External links

Villages in Kruševo Municipality